The Amalgamated Society of Engineers (ASE) was a major British trade union, representing factory workers and mechanics.

History
The history of the union can be traced back to the formation of the Journeymen Steam Engine, Machine Makers' and Millwrights' Friendly Society, in 1826, popularly known as the "Old Mechanics".  Its secretary, William Allan, and another leading figure in the union, William Newton, proposed forming a new union to bring together skilled workers from all engineering trades.  They invited a large number of other unions to become part a new Amalgamated Society of Engineers, Machinists, Smiths, Millwrights and Pattern-makers, which was soon shorted to the Amalgamated Society of Engineers (ASE).   Other than the Old Mechanics, the only notable union to join was the Smiths Benevolent, Sick and Burial Society.  Together with various small, local unions, they brought 5,000 members into the ASE on its creation in 1851, Allan becoming its first general secretary.

The ASE was one of the 'New Model Unions' of the 1850s–1870s. These unions, which also included the Ironfounders, Builders, and Carpenters' societies, rejected Chartism and the ideas of Robert Owen in favour of a more moderate policy based on 'prudence', 'respectability' and steady growth. Great importance was attached to the question of finance, as substantial funds would not only provide maintenance for members involved in strike action, but also help to deter the employers from attacking the organisation. Since its members were skilled and relatively highly paid, it was possible for the ASE to charge contributions of one shilling a week and to build up a fund of unprecedented proportions.  Initially, there were strict restrictions on membership; all must have completed an apprenticeship in their trade, and men who wore glasses were not permitted to join.

The ASE was an immediate success, and within a year, membership had more than doubled to 11,000.  However, in 1852, it agreed a ban on overtime and piecework.  In retaliation, employers began an extended national lockouts, which greatly weakened the organisation, an event repeated in 1896.  But it maintained its pre-eminent position in the industry, and many local and regional unions joined.

The union was invited to join the Federation of Engineering and Shipbuilding Trades (FEST) when it was formed in 1891, but refused to do so.  It also had a turbulent relationship with the Trades Union Congress (TUC), not holding membership in 1905 or from 1907 to 1918.  However, it was a founder member of the General Federation of Trade Unions (GFTU).  It finally joined the FEST in 1905, hoping to persuade its other members to amalgamate with it.  Six small unions did so, but the other refused, and the ASE again left the FEST in 1918.

The ASE set up overseas branches in the United States, Canada, Australia, New Zealand and South Africa.  In 1891, they had only 5,000 members between them, but by 1920 they had grown to 32,000 members.  The union set up an Australasian Council, and in 1906 a South African Council, and the branches in those countries thereafter had a considerable degree of autonomy.  They had their own full-time secretaries and organisers, and became the leading unions for engineers in those countries.  However, in North America, the union failed to grow.  American Organiser Isaac Cowen prioritised strong links with the union in Britain, and the union there came to largely consist of British members who were temporarily working overseas.  Many of them left in 1905 to join the Industrial Workers of the World, and the ASE decided in 1920 to transfer the remaining branches to the International Association of Machinists.

In 1920, the ASE put out a fresh call for other unions to merge with it.  Seventeen unions balloted their members on a possible merger, and nine voted in favour of amalgamation.  Together, they formed the Amalgamated Engineering Union.

Election results
The ASE was an early affiliate of the Labour Party.  It sponsored candidates in each election from 1906 on, with several of its candidates winning election.

Leadership

General Secretaries
1851: William Allan
1875: John Burnett
1886: Robert Austin
1891: John Anderson
1896: George Nicoll Barnes
1909: Jenkin Jones
1912: Robert Young
1919: Tom Mann

Chairmen
1893: Alfred Sellicks
1903: Alfred Golightly
1903: David Gardner
1910: Albert Taylor
1913: James Thomas Brownlie

References

External links
Catalogue of the ASE archives, held at the Modern Records Centre, University of Warwick

 
Defunct trade unions of the United Kingdom
Engineering trade unions
1851 establishments in the United Kingdom
Trade unions established in 1851
Trade unions disestablished in 1920
Trade unions based in London